Señorita Curaçao (In Papiamento: Señorita Kòrsou) is a national beauty pageant in Curaçao. This pageant is unrelated to the Miss Curaçao or Miss International Curaçao pageant.

History
Early for Curaçao at International pageant from Miss Curaçao. The pageant started in 1963 and since then it had sent contestants to the Miss World pageants. The organization started with the creation of the Curaçao Youth Beauty Contest Organization (CYBECO).

Since 2007, a national winner is selected for this international pageant, current titleholder is Stephanie Rose-Chang and competed at Miss World.

Titleholders
Color key

Representatives at Miss World
Curaçao was debuted at the Miss World occurred in 1975. The 1st Runner-up or hand-picked delegate is sent as the national representative.  Of all representatives from the island, 1 of them placed in the semifinals in 2002 and two won special awards in 2000 and 2008. Since 2007, a national winner is selected for this international pageant, current titleholder is Stephanie Rose-Chang.

Representatives at Miss Earth

The second title of Señorita Curaçao will compete at Miss Earth. Curaçao made a debut in 2006. The runner-up or some delegates will pick by Miss Curaçao to compete at the Miss Earth, an annual international beauty pageant promoting environmental awareness.

Additional Details on Curaçao's representatives

 2000 Jozaine Marianella Wall

Jozaine Marianella Wall is one of the two Miss Curaçao that did not attend the Miss Universe pageant. She was 17 years old at the time she won the national pageant which unabled her to compete at this pageant whose minimum age is 18. After a legal battle with the organizers, Jozaine was sent to the Miss World 2000 pageant in London, United Kingdom. She did not place in the Top Ten, but she managed to win the Queen of the Caribbean title.

 2002 Ayanette Mary-Ann Ileana Statia

Ayanette Mary-Ann Ileana Statia competed at Miss Universe 2002 celebrated in San Juan, Puerto Rico. Since her election Ayanette became a strong favorite considered as the best black contestant of the pageant, but Curaçao's name was not called in the semifinals of Miss Universe 2002. After Miss Universe, Ayanette was sent to Miss World 2002 held in Nigeria where she became Curaçao's first and only semifinalist so far in Miss World.

 2003-2004 Angeline Fernandine Da Silva Goes

Angeline Fernandine Da Silva Goes was the first runner-up of the 2003 Miss Curaçao pageant won by Vanessa Maria Van Arendonk. With her placement she had the duty to represent Curaçao at the Miss World 2003 pageant held in Sanya, People's Republic of China. After her performance in Miss World, a group of fans and friends from around the world made a formal petition to Sheida Wever, president of the national pageant, to send her to the Miss Universe pageant. Angeline was chosen as Curaçao's representative to the Miss Universe 2004 pageant held in Quito, Ecuador. Angeline went to the two most important international beauty pageants in the world without even winning the national pageant.

 2008 Norayla Francisco

Norayla Maria Francisco received the title of Miss World Curaçao on 2008 earning the right to represent the island in Miss World 2008 in Johannesburg, South Africa. In the Miss World Top Model competition held in Soweto, Norayla placed in the Top 10 out of 109 contestants.

References

External links
 Miss World

Curaçao
Beauty pageants in Curaçao
Dutch awards
Recurring events established in 2007